Major General Jonathan Swift,  is a senior British Army officer. Since July 2022, he has served as General Officer Commanding, Regional Command.

Military career
Swift was commissioned into the Royal Regiment of Fusiliers in 1995. He became commanding officer of the 1st Battalion, Royal Regiment of Fusiliers in 2011, in which capacity he was deployed to Afghanistan on Operation Herrick 18 as commander of Transition Support Unit Nahr-e-Saraj. He went on to become senior requirements manager for armoured vehicles in Defence Equipment and Support in 2014, Assistant Head for Capability Plans in Army Headquarters in 2015 and commander, 38 (Irish) Brigade in September 2017. After that he became Head of Ground Manoeuvre Capability at Army Headquarters in October 2019 and General Officer Commanding, Regional Command in July 2022.

Swift was appointed an Officer of the Order of the British Empire for services in Afghanistan in March 2014.

References

Living people
Royal Regiment of Fusiliers officers
Officers of the Order of the British Empire
Year of birth missing (living people)